Barsal-nuna (Sumerian: 𒁇𒊩𒉣𒈾 bar.sal.nun.na) of Kish was the seventeenth Sumerian king in the First Dynasty of Kish, according to the Sumerian King List. His father was En-me-nuna; he succeeded his brother Melem-Kish. His name may have meant Sheep of the Prince. Barsal (𒁇𒊩) means A sheep. Barsal-nuna is not mentioned in Early Dynastic documents, meaning that is likely that he was not a historical person.

References 

|-

Kings of Kish
Sumerian kings